Anthony David Driscoll-Glennon (born 26 November 1999) is an English professional footballer who plays as a left back for EFL League Two side Grimsby Town.

Glennon played youth football for Liverpool and Burnley. He made his professional debut during a loan spell with Grimsby Town in 2020 and also spent time on loan at Barrow. He made three Cup appearances for Burnley before returning to Grimsby Town on a permanent deal in July 2022.

Career

Liverpool
Born in Bootle, Merseyside, Glennon started his football career playing for local youth side Croxteth Park, alongside Trent Alexander-Arnold. He joined Liverpool's Academy at the age of six and spent over a decade at the club, progressing through the youth levels to the under-18 squad under Neil Critchley after leaving school. He picked up a few knocks in his first season in the under-18 side, which kept him out of action and he struggled to find a place in the squad until late on in the season. He had to wait until 18 February 2017 to make his first start, when he was drafted in to the line-up against Wolverhampton Wanderers after injuries to others. Critchley was promoted to under-23 boss in the summer of 2017 and replaced by Reds legend Steven Gerrard, but Glennon built up a good relationship with the new boss. However, Glennon didn't impress enough to earn a professional contract and was released at the end of the season.

Burnley
He moved on to sign for Premier League side Burnley in July 2018, after impressing on trial. He was appointed as captain of the under-23 side by manager Steve Stone shortly after his arrival at Turf Moor, and the club made great improvements in their second season in the Professional Development League. On 25 July 2019, he signed a two-year extended contract with option of a further year at Turf Moor following an impressive first season in the under-23 squad, as well as being named on the first team bench for a Premier League game against Manchester City in April. On 7 January 2020, he became manager Ian Holloway's first signing when he joined EFL League Two side Grimsby Town on loan until the end of the season. The move materialised as Holloway had worked with Burnley's chief operating officer Matt Williams when he was at Blackpool, doing a lot of his scouting. Holloway was in desperate need of a left-back and trusted Williams so much that he didn't even watch Glennon play himself before the move was completed.

He moved on loan to Barrow in January 2022. On 10 June 2022, Burnley announced Glennon would leave the club at the end of the month when his contract expired.

Grimsby Town
On 29 June 2022, Glennon signed for former team Grimsby Town, where he had previously played on loan, on a 2-year deal.

Career statistics

References

1999 births
Living people
People from Bootle
English footballers
Liverpool F.C. players
Burnley F.C. players
Grimsby Town F.C. players
Barrow A.F.C. players
English Football League players
Association football fullbacks